The ETAP 30 is a Belgian sailboat that was designed by Jacques de Ridder as a cruiser and first built in 1994.

Production
The design was built by ETAP Yachting in Belgium between 1985 and 1994, with 220 boats completed, but it is now out of production.

Design
The ETAP 30 is a recreational keelboat, built predominantly of polyester glassfibre-foam sandwich construction, with wood trim. The use of foam sandwich construction makes the boat unsinkable. It has a 7/8 fractional sloop masthead sloop rig with aluminum spars, a deck-stepped mast, wire standing rigging and a single set of swept spreaders. The hull has a raked stem, a reverse transom, an internally-mounted spade-type rudder controlled by a tiller and a fin keel or optional shoal draft keel. It displaces  and carries  of cast iron ballast.

The boat is fitted with a Volvo 2002  diesel engine for docking and manoeuvring.

The design has sleeping accommodation for five people, with a double "V"-berth in the bow cabin, two straight settees in the main cabin, plus an aft berth on starboard side. The galley is located on the port side just forward of the companionway ladder. The "L"-shaped galley is equipped with a two-burner stove, an  capacity icebox and a sink. The head is located just aft of the bow cabin.

Operational history
The boat was at one time supported by a class club, the ETAP Owners Association.

A 2009 Yachting Monthly review stated, "In many people's view, this was the best yacht Etap produced – and although she lacks an aft cabin, she was far ahead of her time in many other respects, not least her easily-driven hull, designed by Jac de Ridder, which was streets ahead of most other 30ft cruisers when she was launched, in 1983. She handles delightfully on all points of sail and is still a fairly fast cruiser for her length by today’s standards. The hull’s high freeboard is effectively masked by a thick gunwale stripe and the low-profile cabin top gives her an almost racy appearance. Down below she has five sea-berths (or six at anchor), including a quarterberth, and a heads compartment amidships. The galley is spacious and seamanlike, and she has a very practical chart table. Etap's tendency towards short coachroofs means that headroom in the heads and forecabin is restricted but it is fair in other parts of the boat The standard of fit-out is good, with solid teak trim, but stowage, as always with these double-skinned yachts, is limited."

See also
List of sailing boat types

References

External links

Keelboats
1980s sailboat type designs
Sailing yachts
Trailer sailers
Sailboat type designs by Jacques De Ridder 
Sailboat types built by ETAP Yachting